David William Donald Mackay  (born 1957) is the Chief Pilot of Virgin Galactic, a commercial astronaut and a former RAF test pilot. He is the first native-born Scot to visit space.

Early life
David Mackay was born in Scotland, and lived in Helmsdale, Highland. David's father was a police officer. He would see aircraft flying (low) from RAF Lossiemouth.

David studied Aeronautical Engineering at the University of Glasgow. He first piloted an aircraft in 1977.

Career

Royal Air Force
He joined the RAF in 1979. He flew the Harrier GR3 in Germany and the Falklands.

Test pilot
In 1986 he was selected for test pilot training. In 1988 he graduated from the French test pilots' school, École du personnel navigant d'essais et de réception - EPNER, through an exchange with the RAF's Empire Test Pilots' School. He became Commanding Officer of the RAF's Fast Jet Test Flight in 1992 at RAF Boscombe Down. The fastest speed he reached was Mach 1.4 in a French Mirage. He conducted trials on the Harrier GR7, the Sea Harrier FA.2, and the Tucano. He flew with the Fixed Wing Test Squadron. He was awarded the Air Force Cross in 1992.

Virgin Atlantic
He joined Virgin Atlantic in 1995, flying Boeing 747s as a Captain from 1999; he also flew the Airbus A340 from 2002. He finished his flying career with over 11,000 hours flying.

Virgin Galactic 

He joined Virgin Galactic in 2009, and is now the Chief Pilot. The suborbital spacecraft, SpaceShipTwo (SS2), will reach a height of 360,000 feet. On its journey into space, the SS2 spacecraft will reach Mach 3.5. The first SS2 spacecraft to fly, of which he was one of the pilots, was the VSS Enterprise; the second SS2 spacecraft is called VSS Unity. On 22 February 2019 Mackay became the 569th person, and first Scot, to visit space. He piloted the VSS Unity VF-01 flight above , qualifying him as an FAA commercial astronaut. He has since piloted the Unity 21 and Unity 22 flights, also above .

References

External links
 BBC July 2011
 Telegraph August 2011
 Telegraph October 2010

Audio clips
 West FM 96.7 in July 2012
 2009 interview with Flightglobal.com

Video clips
 

1957 births
Alumni of the University of Glasgow
Scottish test pilots
People from Helmsdale
People from Salisbury
People from Sutherland
Recipients of the Air Force Cross (United Kingdom)
Royal Air Force officers
Scottish aviators
Virgin Galactic
Living people
Commercial astronauts
People who have flown in suborbital spaceflight
American test pilots